Tunguska, formerly also written Tungonska, may refer to:

 The Tunguska event, a catastrophic explosion over Siberia in 1908.

Places
 Rivers in Russia:
 Upper Tunguska, an old name of the lower course of the Angara, tributary of the Yenisey
 Podkamennaya Tunguska ("Stony Tunguska", also: "Middle Tunguska"), tributary of the Yenisey; the place of the Tunguska event
 Nizhnyaya Tunguska ("Lower Tunguska"), tributary of the Yenisey
 Tunguska (Amur), tributary of the Amur
Tunguska Plateau

In arts and entertainment
 Tunguska (album), a 2006 album by Suns of the Tundra
 Secret Files: Tunguska, a 2006 video game
 "Tunguska", a song by Cymbals Eat Guitars
 "Tunguska", a song by Darkest Hour on their album, Deliver Us
 "Tunguska", a song by Fanfarlo on their album, Rooms Filled with Light
 "Tunguska", a song by Hopesfall on their album, Arbiter
 "Tunguska" (The X-Files), a 1996 episode of The X-Files

Other uses
 2K22 Tunguska, a Russian anti-aircraft system
 9M311 Tunguska, a surface-to-air missile used in the Tunguska-M1 system

See also
Podkamennaya Tunguska (disambiguation)
Tungusic peoples